Ifanadiana is a district of Vatovavy in Madagascar.

Communes
The district is further divided into 14 communes, which is sub-divided into 195 fokontany (villages). The postal code is 312.

 Ambiabe
 Ambohimanga Sud
 Ambohimera
 Analampasina
 Androrangavola
 Antaretra
 Antsindra
 Fasintsara
 Ifanadiana
 Kelilalina
 Maroharatra
 Marotoko
 Ranomafana
 Tsaratanana

National Parks
the Ranomafana National Park, one of the most famous national parks of Madagascar.

Roads
National road 25

References 

Districts of Vatovavy